

NGC 6744 (also known as Caldwell 101) is an intermediate spiral galaxy about 30 million light-years away in the constellation Pavo (Peacock). It is considered as a Milky Way mimic in the immediate vicinity, displaying flocculent (fluffy) arms and an elongated core. It also has at least one distorted companion galaxy (NGC 6744A) superficially similar to one of the Magellanic Clouds. It was discovered from Parramatta in Australia by Scottish astronomer James Dunlop on 30 June 1826.

NGC 6744 lies within the Virgo Supercluster.

See also

 NGC 2336 - another spiral galaxy of similar size and shape
 NGC 1232
 SPT0418-47 - a spiral galaxy of similar size and shape when the universe was 1.4 billion years old
 UGC 12158

References

External links

 
 NGC 6744, a Milky Way-like spiral galaxy
 NGC 6744 (Pav) 
 June 4, 2010 – A Sibling of the Milky Way (Wise image of NGC 6744)
 A spiral galaxy that resembles our Milky Way (1 June 2011)
 

Virgo Supercluster
Intermediate spiral galaxies
Pavo (constellation)
6744
62836
101b
Astronomical objects discovered in 1826